Strempeliopsis is a genus of plant in family Apocynaceae, first described as a genus in 1876. The entire genus is known only from the West Indies, islands of Cuba and Jamaica.

Species
Strempeliopsis arborea Urb. - W Jamaica
Strempeliopsis strempelioides (Griseb.) Benth. ex B.D.Jacks. - Cuba

References

 
Flora of Cuba
Flora of Jamaica
Taxonomy articles created by Polbot
Apocynaceae genera